Vefa Tanır (1927 – 10 March 2023) was a Turkish politician who served as minister of health and scial assistance, minister of public works, minister of forestry, and minister of national defense.

References

1927 births
2023 deaths
Republican People's Party (Turkey) politicians
Ministers of National Defence of Turkey
Health ministers of Turkey
Ministers of Agriculture and Forestry of Turkey